In geometry, this uniform polyhedron compound is a composition of 5 cuboctahedra. It has icosahedral symmetry Ih.

Cartesian coordinates 
Cartesian coordinates for the vertices of this compound are all the cyclic permutations of

 (±2, 0, ±2)
 (±τ, ±τ−1, ±(2τ−1))
 (±1, ±τ−2, ±τ2)

where τ = (1+)/2 is the golden ratio (sometimes written φ).

References 
.

Polyhedral compounds